The Royal Enfield Fury is a British motorcycle made by Royal Enfield at their factory in Redditch. The Fury name has also been used by Royal Enfield Motors in India for a 175 cc motorcycle and for a new 499 cc single in their range for 2011.

Development
Launched in 1959, the 499 cc Fury was planned for the US export market to compete against the BSA Gold Star and Velocette Venom. Developed from the Royal Enfield Bullet and sharing many of the cycle parts, the Fury had an aluminium alloy barrel with cast iron liner and a high compression piston.

Intended for serious off-road and competition use, the Fury was supplied with optional lights, mounting an optional rev counter, an  rear wheel and a  front wheel. Only 191 Furies were made between 1959 and 1963, when production ended.

Enfield Fury 175
The 'Fury' name was revived by Enfield India for a licensed copy of the German Zündapp KS175. Royal Enfield (India) assembled the 163 cc Fury from parts imported from Germany when Zündapp Motorcycles ceased production and closed their factories in 1984. It had five-speed gearbox, a hydraulic Brembo disc brake and a sleeveless hard chromed cylinder barrel, all were a first on a motorcycle in that country.

2011 Royal Enfield Fury
The Royal Enfield Fury name has been used again for a new 499 cc single-cylinder model by Royal Enfield India and forms part of their range for 2011. The new Fury has fuel injection and is the first Royal Enfield motorcycle in 40 years with twin exhaust pipes. The new Fury is supplied with a chrome headlight and digital instruments, with a fibreglass single seat unit incorporating a rear light.

References

See also
List of motorcycles of the 1950s

Fury
Motorcycles introduced in 1959